Revenue stamps of Guernsey refer to the various revenue or fiscal stamps, whether adhesive or directly embossed, which were issued by the States of Guernsey for use on the island of Guernsey, a British Crown dependency. There were general-duty revenues, along with issues for Entertainments Tax, Sales Tax, Income Tax and Insurance.

Alderney, a part of Guernsey, also issued revenue stamps from 1923 to 1962.

See also
Postage stamps and postal history of Guernsey
Revenue stamps of the Isle of Man
Revenue stamps of Jersey
Revenue stamps of the United Kingdom

References

Economy of Guernsey
Guernsey